Rajmahal is a palace in Mehsana, Gujarat, India. Built in 1904 by Sayajirao Gaekwad III of Baroda State, it was used as the government office and later as the court until 2017. It has three floors and 130 rooms.

History
Gaekwads conquered Baroda and established Baroda State in 1721. They expanded their rule in north Gujarat and established Patan as its administrative headquarters. Later the headquarters was moved to Kadi and subsequently to Mehsana in 1902 when the city was connected by the Gaekwar's Baroda State Railway which was opened in 1887.

It was designed by the English architect Frederick William Stevens. Intended for his son, Fatehsinhrao Gaekwad, who died shortly afterwards in 1908, the palace was then handed over to the municipal authorities. In 1960, when Mehsana was made the district headquarters of Mehsana district, the palace was rented by the Government as the Collector's Office. Later it was used as the district court until 2017. The palace is unused since and the Gaekwad family is under process in the court to take over its possession. There is a proposal to convert it in a heritage hotel as well as a museum.

Architecture
It has three floors and 130 rooms in total; the ground floor with 70 rooms, the first floor with 55 rooms and the second floor with five rooms. The palace is crowned by one large onion-shaped dome, eight small onion-shaped domes and eight small pyramidal domes.

There is a statue of Sayajirao Gaekwad III in the open square in front of the palace.

See also 

 Boter Kothani Vav
 Dudhsagar Dairy plant
 Nagalpur Lake
 Para Lake

References

Palaces in Gujarat
Royal residences in India
Tourist attractions in Mehsana district
Mehsana
Buildings and structures completed in 1904
Houses completed in 1904
Indo-Saracenic Revival architecture
Baroda State
20th-century architecture in India